The Coupe de France 1988–89 was its 72nd edition. It was won by Olympique de Marseille.

Round of 16

Quarter-finals

Semi-finals

Final

Topscorer
Jean-Pierre Papin (11 goals)

References

French federation

1988–89 domestic association football cups
1988–89 in French football
1988-89